Alexander Volkov (born October 24, 1988) is a Russian professional mixed martial artist. He currently competes in the Heavyweight division for the Ultimate Fighting Championship (UFC). A professional MMA competitor since 2009, Volkov previously competed for the M-1 Global promotion, as well as Bellator MMA. He is a former heavyweight champion in both promotions. As of March 13, 2023, he is #7 in the UFC heavyweight rankings.'

Mixed martial arts career

M-1 Global
In 2008 Volkov signed with the M-1 Global. His professional MMA debut came in April 2009 when he defeated Nikolay Pleshakov by TKO (punches) in just 80 seconds. Volkov followed this up a month later with another TKO victory, this time against Adam Alikhanov in just 20 seconds. A further month later, Volkov suffered his first professional loss at the hands of Akhmed Sultanov. Midway through the first round, Volkov was forced to tap to an armbar. Volkov then went on a two-fight win streak, both via TKO.

In December 2009, after just eight months as a professional fighter, Volkov faced Ibragim Magomedov at M-1 Challenge 20 - 2009 Finals. Coming in as an underdog, his team simply wanted him to make it through all three rounds, but Volkov exceeded expectations by winning via unanimous decision. Volkov was awarded an M-1 Global ring "as a reward for exceptional performance".

Volkov faced Denis Smoldarev on February 19, 2016, M-1 Challenge 64 for the vacant M-1 Global Heavyweight title, he won the fight via submission (triangle choke).

Volkov faced former Bellator light heavyweight champion Attila Végh on June 16, 2016, at M-1 Challenge 68. He won the fight via knockout in the first round. This and other fights of Alexander Volkov in the M-1 league can be viewed in the All fights of Alexander Volkov in M-1 Global of the M-1 Global TV channel.

M-1 Eastern European Tournament
Within his first year of professional competition, Volkov was competing in the M-1 Eastern European tournament, taking victories in the opening round and the semi-final. Volkov progressed to the M-1 Selection 2010 - Eastern Europe Finals, where a win would put him in line to challenge for the M-1 Global Heavyweight title at the 2010 M-1 Challenge Season events. To reach the championship fight, Volkov first had to take on Maxim Grishin to become the Eastern Europe champion. Unfortunately for Volkov, he fell prey to a rear-naked choke early in the opening round and was eliminated.

Post M-1 Eastern European Tournament
Less than a month later, Volkov took his first fight outside of M-1 in nearly a year. His opponent was the debuting Eldar Yagudin, who he defeated inside the opening round by TKO (punches).

On August 5, 2011, as part of League-70 Russia vs Brazil, held in Sochi, Russia, Alexander Volkov defeated the undefeated at that time Bulgarian Nedyalko Karadzhov via TKO in the opening round.

Bellator MMA
In September 2012, it was announced that Volkov would compete for Bellator Fighting Championships. He made his U.S. debut in the Bellator season seven heavyweight tournament. In the opening, quarter-final round he faced Brett Rogers at Bellator 75. Volkov dominated the fight by making the most of his reach advantage. Volkov won via unanimous decision. In the semifinals at
Bellator 80, he faced Vinicius Queiroz and won via TKO in the second round. On December 14, Volkov fought Richard Hale in a 5 round fight for Bellator Season 7 Heavyweight Tournament Final and Bellator Heavyweight Championship. Volkov won via unanimous decision.

In his first title defense, Volkov faced Vitaly Minakov in the co-main event at Bellator 108 on November 15, 2013. He lost the bout and his title via TKO in the first round.

Volkov faced Mark Holata on March 7, 2014, at Bellator 111 in Heavyweight Tournament. He won the fight via TKO in the first round. Volkov faced Mighty Mo in the semifinals at Bellator 116 on April 11, 2014. He won the fight via spectacular knockout in the first round.

Volkov faced Blagoy Ivanov in the finals on May 17, 2014, at Bellator 120. He won the fight via submission in the second round.

Nearly a year since his last fight for the promotion, Volkov faced Tony Johnson at Bellator 136 on April 10, 2015. He lost the fight via split decision.

Volkov faced Cheick Kongo at Bellator 139 on June 26, 2015. He lost the fight via unanimous decision marking his second consecutive loss being cut by the Bellator MMA.

Ultimate Fighting Championship
In September 2016, it was announced that Volkov has signed with the Ultimate Fighting Championship. He made his debut against Timothy Johnson on November 19, 2016, at UFC Fight Night 99. Volkov was awarded a controversial split decision victory. 12 out of 12 media scores gave the bout to Johnson.

Volkov faced Roy Nelson on April 15, 2017, at UFC on Fox 24. He won the fight via unanimous decision.

Volkov faced Stefan Struve on September 2, 2017, at UFC Fight Night: Volkov vs. Struve. He won the bout via TKO in the third round. The win also earned Volkov his first Fight of the Night bonus award.

Volkov faced Fabrício Werdum on March 17, 2018, at UFC Fight Night 127. He won the back-and-forth fight via knockout in the fourth round. The win also earned Volkov his first Performance of the Night bonus award.

Volkov faced Derrick Lewis on October 6, 2018, at UFC 229. Volkov dominated the fight, hurting Lewis multiple times, but ultimately lost the fight via knockout late in round three.

Volkov was expected to face Alistair Overeem on April 20, 2019, at UFC Fight Night 149. However, on April 3, 2019 it was reported Volkov pulled out from the fight for undisclosed reason.

Volkov was scheduled to face Junior Dos Santos on November 9, 2019 at UFC on ESPN+ 21. However, dos Santos was forced to pull out from the event due to contracting a serious bacterial infection, and he was replaced by Greg Hardy. He won the fight via unanimous decision.

Volkov faced Curtis Blaydes on June 20, 2020 at UFC on ESPN: Blaydes vs. Volkov.  Volkov lost the fight by unanimous decision.

Volkov faced Walt Harris on October 24, 2020 at UFC 254. He won the fight via technical knockout in round two.

Volkov faced Alistair Overeem on February 6, 2021 at UFC Fight Night 184. He won the fight via technical knockout in round two. This win earned him the Performance of the Night award.

Volkov faced Ciryl Gane on June 26, 2021 at UFC Fight Night 190. He lost the fight via unanimous decision.

Volkov faced Marcin Tybura on October 30, 2021 at UFC 267. He won the bout via unanimous decision.

Volkov faced  Tom Aspinall on March 19, 2022  at  UFC Fight Night 204. Volkov lost the fight via straight armbar submission in round one.

Volkov faced Jairzinho Rozenstruik on June 4, 2022 at UFC Fight Night 207. He won the fight via technical knockout in round one.

Volkov faced Alexander Romanov on March 11, 2023 at UFC Fight Night 221. He won the fight via technical knockout in the first round.

Fighting style

Volkov is primarily a standup striker. He utilizes his considerable height, long reach, and powerful kicks to deliver accurate strikes from a distance. In particular, he is known for his patient and technical pugilism as well as his punishing body kicks, which he utilized at UFC 254 in his knockout victory against Walt Harris.

Championships and accomplishments
Bellator Fighting Championships
Bellator Heavyweight World Championship (One time)
Bellator Season Ten Heavyweight Tournament Championship
Bellator Season Seven Heavyweight Tournament Championship
M-1 Global
M-1 Global Heavyweight Championship (One time)
One successful title defence
M-1 Eastern European Tournament Runner-Up
Ultimate Fighting Championship
Fight of the Night (One time) 
Performance of the Night (Two times)

Mixed martial arts record

|-
|Win
|align=center|36–10
|Alexander Romanov
|TKO (punches)
|UFC Fight Night: Yan vs. Dvalishvili
|
|align=center|1
|align=center|2:16
|Las Vegas, Nevada, United States
|
|-
|Win
|align=center|35–10
|Jairzinho Rozenstruik
|TKO (punches)
|UFC Fight Night: Volkov vs. Rozenstruik
|
|align=center|1
|align=center|2:12
|Las Vegas, Nevada, United States
|
|-
|Loss
|align=center|34–10
|Tom Aspinall
|Submission (straight armbar)
|UFC Fight Night: Volkov vs. Aspinall
|
|align=center|1
|align=center|3:45
|London, England
|
|-
|Win
|align=center|34–9
|Marcin Tybura 
|Decision (unanimous)
|UFC 267 
|
|align=center|3
|align=center|5:00
|Abu Dhabi, United Arab Emirates
|  
|-
|Loss
|align=center|33–9
|Ciryl Gane
|Decision (unanimous)
|UFC Fight Night: Gane vs. Volkov
|
|align=center|5
|align=center|5:00
|Las Vegas, Nevada, United States
|
|-
|Win
|align=center|33–8
|Alistair Overeem
|TKO (punches)
|UFC Fight Night: Overeem vs. Volkov
|
|align=center|2
|align=center|2:06
|Las Vegas, Nevada, United States
|
|-
|Win
|align=center|32–8
|Walt Harris
|TKO (body kick and punches)
|UFC 254
|
|align=center|2
|align=center|1:15
|Abu Dhabi, United Arab Emirates
|
|-
|Loss
|align=center|31–8
|Curtis Blaydes
|Decision (unanimous)
|UFC on ESPN: Blaydes vs. Volkov 
|
|align=center|5
|align=center|5:00
|Las Vegas, Nevada, United States
|  
|-
|Win
|align=center|31–7
|Greg Hardy
|Decision (unanimous)
|UFC Fight Night: Magomedsharipov vs. Kattar
|
|align=center|3
|align=center|5:00
|Moscow, Russia
|
|-
|Loss
|align=center|30–7
|Derrick Lewis
|KO (punches)
|UFC 229
|
|align=center|3
|align=center|4:49
|Las Vegas, Nevada, United States
| 
|-
|Win
|align=center|30–6
|Fabrício Werdum
|KO (punches)
|UFC Fight Night: Werdum vs. Volkov
|
|align=center|4
|align=center|1:38
|London, England
|
|-
|Win
|align=center|29–6
|Stefan Struve
|TKO (punches)
|UFC Fight Night: Volkov vs. Struve
|
|align=center|3
|align=center|3:30
|Rotterdam, Netherlands
|
|-
|Win
|align=center|28–6
|Roy Nelson
|Decision (unanimous)
|UFC on Fox: Johnson vs. Reis
|
|align=center|3
|align=center|5:00
|Kansas City, Missouri, United States
|
|-
|Win
|align=center|27–6
|Timothy Johnson
|Decision (split)
|UFC Fight Night: Mousasi vs. Hall 2
|
|align=center|3
|align=center|5:00
|Belfast, Northern Ireland
|
|-
| Win
| align=center| 26–6
| Attila Végh
| KO (punches)
| M-1 Challenge 68
| 
| align=center| 1
| align=center| 2:38
| Moscow, Russia
| 
|-
| Win
| align=center| 25–6
| Denis Smoldarev
| Submission (triangle choke)
| M-1 Challenge 64
| 
| align=center| 3
| align=center| 0:41
| Moscow, Russia
| 
|-
| Loss
| align=center| 24–6
| Cheick Kongo
| Decision (unanimous)
| Bellator 139
| 
| align=center| 3
| align=center| 5:00
| Mulvane, Kansas, United States
| 
|-
| Loss
| align=center| 24–5
| Tony Johnson
| Decision (split)
| Bellator 136
| 
| align=center| 3
| align=center| 5:00
| Irvine, California, United States
| 
|-
| Win
| align=center| 24–4
| Alexei Kudin
| Decision (unanimous)
| Union MMA Pro
| 
| align=center| 3
| align=center| 5:00
| Krasnodar, Russia
| 
|-
| Win
| align=center| 23–4
| Roy Boughton
| TKO (punches)
| Tech-Krep FC: Battle of Heroes
| 
| align=center| 1
| align=center| 0:40
| Saint Petersburg, Russia
| 
|-
| Win
| align=center| 22–4
| Blagoy Ivanov
| Submission (rear-naked choke)
| Bellator 120
| 
| align=center| 2
| align=center| 1:08
| Southaven, Mississippi, United States
| 
|-
| Win
| align=center| 21–4
| Mighty Mo
| KO (head kick)
| Bellator 116
| 
| align=center| 1
| align=center| 2:44
| Temecula, California, United States
| 
|-
| Win
| align=center| 20–4
| Mark Holata
| TKO (punches)
| Bellator 111
| 
| align=center| 1
| align=center| 1:21
| Thackerville, Oklahoma, United States
| 
|-
| Loss
| align=center| 19–4
| Vitaly Minakov
| TKO (punches)
| Bellator 108
| 
| align=center| 1
| align=center| 2:57
| Atlantic City, New Jersey, United States
| 
|-
| Win
| align=center| 19–3
| Rich Hale
| Decision (unanimous)
| Bellator 84
| 
| align=center| 5
| align=center| 5:00
| Hammond, Indiana, United States
| 
|-
| Win
| align=center| 18–3
| Vinicius Queiroz
| TKO (punches)
| Bellator 80
| 
| align=center| 2
| align=center| 4:59
| Hollywood, Florida, United States
| 
|-
| Win
| align=center| 17–3
| Brett Rogers
| Decision (unanimous)
| Bellator 75
| 
| align=center| 3
| align=center| 5:00
| Hammond, Indiana, United States
| 
|-
| Win
| align=center| 16–3
| Stefan Stankovic
| TKO (punches)
| FEFoMP: Mayor Cup 2012
| 
| align=center| 1
| align=center| 4:27
| Khabarovsk, Russia
| 
|-
| Win
| align=center| 15–3
| Ricco Rodriguez
| Decision (unanimous)
| BF: Baltic Challenge 3
| 
| align=center| 3
| align=center| 5:00
| Kaliningrad, Russia
| 
|-
| Win
| align=center| 14–3
| Arsen Abdulkerimov
| TKO (punches)
| M-1 Global: Fedor vs. Monson
| 
| align=center| 1
| align=center| 0:26
| Moscow, Russia
| 
|-
| Win
| align=center| 13–3
| Bahodir Ibrogimov
| TKO (punches)
| MMA Corona Cup 1
| 
| align=center| 2
| align=center| 2:22
| Moscow, Russia
| 
|-
| Win
| align=center| 12–3
| Nedyalko Karadzhov
| TKO (punches)
| League-70: Russia vs. Brazil
| 
| align=center| 1
| align=center| 2:41
| Sochi, Russia
| 
|-
| Win
| align=center| 11–3
| Denis Goltsov
| TKO (punches)
| M-1 Challenge 25: Zavurov vs. Enomoto
| 
| align=center| 2
| align=center| 3:05
| Saint Petersburg, Russia
| 
|-
| Win
| align=center| 10–3
| Ruslan Chapko
| TKO (punches)
| Mix Fight Tournament
| 
| align=center| 1
| align=center| N/A
| Voronezh, Russia
| 
|-
| Loss
| align=center| 9–3
| Pat Bennett
| Decision (unanimous)
| M-1 Challenge 22: Narkun vs. Vasilevsky
| 
| align=center| 4
| align=center| 5:00
| Moscow, Russia
|
|-
| Win
| align=center| 9–2
| Evgeni Babich
| TKO (punches)
| LM: Tournament 3
| 
| align=center| 1
| align=center| 2:10
| Lipetsk, Russia
| 
|-
| Win
| align=center| 8–2
| Eldar Yagudin
| TKO (punches)
| Ratnoe Pole
| 
| align=center| 1
| align=center| 4:34
| Ryazan, Russia
| 
|-
| Loss
| align=center| 7–2
| Maxim Grishin
| Submission (rear-naked choke)
| M-1 Selection 2010: Eastern Europe Finals
| 
| align=center| 1
| align=center| 2:39
| Moscow, Russia
| 
|-
| Win
| align=center| 7–1
| Alexander Romaschenko
| Submission (rear-naked choke)
| M-1 Selection 2010: Eastern Europe Round 3
| 
| align=center| 1
| align=center| 2:59
| Kyiv, Ukraine
| 
|-
| Win
| align=center| 6–1
| Vitalii Yalovenko
| TKO (doctor stoppage)
| M-1 Selection 2010: Eastern Europe Round 2
| 
| align=center| 2
| align=center| 1:05
| Kyiv, Ukraine
| 
|-
| Win
| align=center| 5–1
| Ibragim Magomedov
| Decision (unanimous)
| M-1 Challenge 20: 2009 Finals
| 
| align=center| 3
| align=center| 5:00
| Saint Petersburg, Russia
| 
|-
| Win
| align=center| 4–1
| Smbat Zakaryan
| TKO (punches)
| ProFC: Union Nation Cup 3
| 
| align=center| 1
| align=center| 4:20
| Rostov-on-Don, Russia
| 
|-
| Win
| align=center| 3–1
| Abdulhalik Magomedov
| TKO (punches)
| M-1 Challenge: 2009 Selections 8
| 
| align=center| 1
| align=center| 4:43
| Moscow, Russia
| 
|-
| Loss
| align=center| 2–1
| Akhmed Sultanov
| Submission (armbar)
| M-1 Challenge: 2009 Selections 4
| 
| align=center| 1
| align=center| 2:50
| Saint Petersburg, Russia
| 
|-
| Win
| align=center| 2–0
| Adam Alikhanov
| TKO (punches)
| M-1 Challenge: 2009 Selections 3
| 
| align=center| 1
| align=center| 0:20
| Saint Petersburg, Russia
| 
|-
| Win
| align=center| 1–0
| Nikolay Pleshakov
| TKO (punches)
| M-1 Challenge: 2009 Selections 2
| 
| align=center| 1
| align=center| 1:20
| Saint Petersburg, Russia
| 
|-

References

External links
 
 

1988 births
Living people
Russian male mixed martial artists
Heavyweight mixed martial artists
Mixed martial artists utilizing Ashihara kaikan
Mixed martial artists utilizing Kyokushin kaikan
Mixed martial artists utilizing Brazilian jiu-jitsu
Russian male karateka
Russian practitioners of Brazilian jiu-jitsu
Martial artists from Moscow
Ultimate Fighting Championship male fighters
Bellator MMA champions